Nephele funebris is a moth of the family Sphingidae.

References

Nephele (moth)
Moths described in 1793
Moths of Africa